Ted Ames (born 1939) is a Maine fisherman, and former hatchery director of Penobscot East Resource Center.

Life
He graduated from the University of Maine with a master's degree in biochemistry. He mapped the fish spawning grounds over time showing a loss of productive grounds. 
He was  a Scholar-in-Residence at Bowdoin College in Brunswick, Maine 2010–2011.

Awards 
 2005 MacArthur Fellows Program
 2007 University of Maine Geddes W. Simpson Distinguished Lecture

See also
 List of American fishers

References

External links 
 Alec Wilkinson, Profiles, “The Lobsterman,” The New Yorker, July 31, 2006, p. 56
 "Ted Ames", Maine Public Broadcasting Network, February 28, 2008
 "The Future of Fish", On Point'', November 7, 2006

1939 births
University of Maine alumni
American fishers
MacArthur Fellows
Living people
People from Hancock County, Maine